Pseudoclitocybe is a genus of fungi in the family Pseudoclitocybaceae. The genus contains about ten species with a collectively widespread distribution.

Species
Pseudoclitocybe atra
Pseudoclitocybe bacillaris
Pseudoclitocybe beschidica
Pseudoclitocybe cyathiformis
Pseudoclitocybe expallens
Pseudoclitocybe foetida
Pseudoclitocybe lapalmaensis
Pseudoclitocybe lenta
Pseudoclitocybe martipanis
Pseudoclitocybe obbata
Pseudoclitocybe parvula
Pseudoclitocybe sabulophila
Pseudoclitocybe sphagneti
Pseudoclitocybe trivialis

See also

List of Agaricales genera

References

External links

Agaricales genera